Industrial Development Bank of Pakistan is located in Karachi, Sindh, Pakistan. It is among the oldest financing institutions in Pakistan.

History
Industrial Development Bank of Pakistan (IDBP) is one of Pakistan's oldest development financing institutions and was created with the primary objective of extending term finance for investment in the manufacturing sector of the economy. Over the years, however, the Bank has become an institution fostering the growth of Small and Medium Enterprises in the rural/less developed regions of the country.

Industrial Development Bank of Pakistan is wholly owned by Pakistani Government entities with 57% of its shares held by the  
Federal Government, 36% by the State Bank of Pakistan and 7% by Provincial Governments and other public sector corporations. Its board of directors consists of representatives of the private sector appointed by the Ministry of Finance.

The IDBP has suffered from significant losses due to loan defaults.  By the mid-2000s, the IDBP had accumulated a loss of about Rs27 billion and was insolvent. The Pakistani government merged IBDP with the Profitable Investment Corporation of Pakistan in 2006 in part to improve IBDP's financial performance.

The bank continued to struggle commercially and by end of 2009 the accumulated deficit had risen to Rs28 billion. The Pakistani government continues to explore ways to make IDBP economically viable.

Mission
The Bank provides Medium and Long Term Finance in local and Foreign Currencies for fixed asset investment in new industrial projects as well as for expansion, balancing, modernization or replacement of existing projects. It extends technical, financial and managerial advice to its clients in planning and execution of the industrial projects. It also facilitates transfer of technologies from developed countries to industrial enterprises in Pakistan.

A unique feature of Industrial Development Bank of Pakistan is that besides Development Financing Institution, it is also a Scheduled Bank and authorized dealer of Foreign Exchange. Thus, IDBP extends all kinds of Merchant, Investment and Commercial Banking services to its clients which include provision of short term advances, Trade Financing, Lease Financing, guarantees and under-writing. Thus, Industrial Development Bank of Pakistan operates a full-fledged Bank in addition to its role as a Development Financing Institution.

Industrial Development Bank of Pakistan has the unique distinction of financing the first ever projects for a diversified list of products. These include Ultra High Temperature (UHT) pack milk, three wheelers, radio/wireless receiving sets, Marble Processing, Coal Mining, Granite, Acetic Yarn, PVC Deep Sea Fishing etc. The projects implemented through IDBP’s financing generated over 100,000 new jobs and have an export potential of about Rs.10.00 billion per annum. The value addition by the completed project is estimated at about Rs.15 billion per annum.

Functions
Development banking business
 Provides guarantee, loans
 Provides medium and long term finances

Commercial banking business
 Bills
 Deposits 
 Foreign Exchange accounts
 Guarantees
 Letter of Credit
 Remittances
 Short term advances

Merchant banking business
 Bridge Financing
 Leasing
 Underwriting of public issue of shares
    
Collection of utility bills
 Gas bills at branches in Karachi
 Telephone bills at all branches

Administers of the equity participation fund

Equity investment/trading

Branch Network
The Head Office of Industrial Development Bank of Pakistan is situated at Karachi, Sindh, Pakistan. The Bank currently operates with following 13 branches:

In Capital Territory; Islamabad and Rawalpindi Branch (Part of the Province of Punjab)

In the Province of Sindh; Main branch Karachi, Hyderabad and Larkana Branch

In the Province of Punjab; Faisalabad, Lahore and Multan Branch

In the Province of Khyber Pakhtunkhwa; Abbottabad and Peshawar Branch

In the Province of Balochistan; Quetta Branch

In the Province of Gilgit-Baltistan; Gilgit Branch

In Azad Kashmir; Mirpur Azad Kashmir Branch

References

External links

 Official site

Banks of Pakistan
Government-owned companies of Pakistan
Companies based in Karachi